"You Mean the World to Me" is a song by American singer-songwriter Toni Braxton. It was written and produced by Antonio "L.A." Reid, Kenneth "Babyface" Edmonds, and Daryl Simmons for her self-titled debut album (1993). Selected as the album's fourth single, it was released on CD on April 22, 1994 by LaFace and Arista Records. It peaked at number seven on the US Billboard Hot 100 and number three on the Billboard Hot R&B Singles chart, while reaching the top ten of the Canadian Singles Chart.

Critical reception
Larry Flick from Billboard described the song as a "warm and fuzzy ballad", adding that "finger-poppin' rhythms give motion to a virtual mountain of slick synths. Of course, her increasingly familiar vocal style is a total joy. Watch this one soar up the charts within mere moments." Troy J. Augusto from Cash Box noted it as "a down-tempo soul burner", that "actually brings Toni closer to the style of Whitney Houston, her closest R&B competitor. Already in heavy rotation at many urban stations, a sure-bet hit." Alan Jones from Music Week declared it "a typically tuneful, intelligent and pleasing LA and BabyFace creation, custom-built for Braxton's soulful scale-sliding. As well as being a hit in its own right, expect this to push her album into a higher orbit." Ralph Tee from the magazine's RM Dance Update commented, "On the back of two hits, this record should face very little resistance as it eases nicely into the charts. Vocally, the track gives Toni another opportunity to showcase one of the best set of tonsils about and forces the shuffling midtempo pace and production to take a back seat." Another editor, James Hamilton deemed it a "glorious gurgling sultry swayer".

Commercial performance
In the United States on April 2, 1994, the song debuted on the Billboard Hot 100 at number 86, 20 days ahead of its initial release. On April 9, 1994 in its second week the song moved up number 52. The song continued to rise at numbers 37, 23, 17 in its third, fourth and fifth week. In its sixth, seventh and eighth week the song rose to numbers 16, 14 and 10. On May 28, 1994, the song reached its peak at number seven remaining for one week. The song continued to spend a total of 31 weeks on the Billboard chart before leaving the Hot 100 at number 47 on October 29, 1994.

On June 12, 1994 the song debuted at number 36 in New Zealand and reached its peak at number 32 on July 3, 1994 spending a total of five weeks before leaving the New Zealand Singles Chart. On July 9, 1994 the song peaked at number 30 in the United Kingdom and became a non-mover for two weeks. The song later fell to numbers 40, 50, and 68 in its third, fourth and fifth week respectively. On July 25, 1994 the song peaked at number 69 in Germany and remained in the German Singles Chart for seven weeks before leaving the chart on November 11, 1994. On September 4, 1994 the song peaked at number 49 in Australia lasting one week before falling out of the Australian Singles Chart.

Music video
The music video for "You Mean the World to Me" was directed by Lionel C. Martin. The video shows a sequence of Braxton playing the piano in a mansion intercut with scenes with her love interest (portrayed by German-born Michael Calvin Bacon, who later starred as J.B. Reese on Saban's syndicated television series VR Troopers). It stayed in heavy rotation during the spring and summer of 1994. The video was released to Braxton's VEVO account on October 25, 2009.

Track listings and formats

 US CD single 1993
 "You Mean the World to Me" (Radio Edit) – 4:00
 "You Mean the World to Me" (Radio Edit Remix) – 4:11
 "You Mean the World to Me" (Extended Mix) – 5:32
 "Seven Whole Days" (Live) – 6:15

 US CD single 1994
 "You Mean the World to Me" (Radio Edit) – 4:00
 "You Mean the World to Me" (Album Version) – 4:54

 UK CD single
 "You Mean the World to Me" (Radio Edit) – 4:00
 "You Mean the World to Me" (Extended Mix) – 5:32
 "Seven Whole Days" (Ghetto Vibe) – 6:32
 "Seven Whole Days" (Live) – 6:15

 UK and Germany 12" single 1994
 Side A:
 "You Mean the World to Me" (Extended Mix) – 5:32
 Side B:
 "Seven Whole Days" (Ghetto Vibe) – 6:32
 "Seven Whole Days" (Ghetto Instrumental) – 6:36

 Europe CD single
 "You Mean the World to Me" (Radio Edit) – 4:00
 "Seven Whole Days" (Live Version) (Radio Edit) – 4:42

Credits and personnel
Credits taken from liner notes.

 Performers and musicians

 Toni Braxton - Vocals, Background
 Kayo - Bass
 Antonio "L.A." Reid - Drums
 Kenny "Babyface" Edmonds - Keyboards
 Vance Taylor - Keyboards
 DeRock - Percussion

 Technical personnel

 A&R (A&R Direction) – Bryant Reid
 Copyright – LaFace Records
 Engineer – Jim "Z" Zumpano
 Executive Producer – L.A. Reid And Babyface
 Manufactured By – Arista Records, Inc.
 Mastered By – Herb Powers
 Mastered At – DMS
 Mixed At – Studio LaCoCo
 Mixed By – Dave Way, L.A. Reid
 Photography – Randee St. Nicholas
 Phonographic Copyright – LaFace Records
 Pressed By – Sonopress USA – 65151-01
 Producer – Daryl Simmons, L.A. Reid, Babyface
 Programmed By – John Frye
 Recorded At – Studio LaCoCo
 Recorded At – LaCoCoCabana
 Written By – Daryl Simmons, L.A. Reid, Babyface

Charts and certifications

Weekly charts

Year-end charts

Certifications

Release history

References

1990s ballads
1993 songs
1994 singles
Toni Braxton songs
Songs written by Daryl Simmons
Songs written by Babyface (musician)
Songs written by L.A. Reid
Song recordings produced by Babyface (musician)
Song recordings produced by L.A. Reid
Song recordings produced by Daryl Simmons
Pop ballads
Contemporary R&B ballads
Soul ballads
LaFace Records singles
Arista Records singles